Neillieae is a tribe of flowering plants in rose family and the Amygdaloideae subfamily. It includes the genera Physocarpus and Neillia.

References

 
Amygdaloideae
Rosales tribes